The Temple of Shadows (French:La vestale du Gange) is a 1927 French silent film directed by André Hugon and starring Camille Bert, Max Tréjean and Georges Melchior.

Cast
 Camille Bert 
 Max Tréjean 
 Georges Melchior 
 Paul Franceschi
 Simone d'A-Lal 
 Félix d'Aps 
 Bernhard Goetzke 
 Madame Lenoir 
 Regina Thomas

References

Bibliography
 Rège, Philippe. Encyclopedia of French Film Directors, Volume 1. Scarecrow Press, 2009.

External links

1927 films
Films directed by André Hugon
French silent films
French black-and-white films
1920s French films